Lake El Toyonal is a small lake in Contra Costa County, California in an unincorporated area of parklands between Orinda and Berkeley.

See also
 List of lakes in California
 List of lakes in the San Francisco Bay Area

Lakes of Contra Costa County, California
Lakes of the San Francisco Bay Area
Lakes of California
Lakes of Northern California